Brian McComas (born May 23, 1972) is an American country music artist. Originally signed to Mercury Nashville Records in 2001, McComas charted two minor singles in 2001 and 2002. A year later, he switched to Lyric Street Records, charting the Top Ten single "99.9% Sure (I've Never Been Here Before)" on the Billboard Hot Country Singles & Tracks charts. His eponymous debut album was also released that year. It produced an additional single before McComas was dropped from Lyric Street. He later signed to Katapult Records, which released his second album, Back Up Again, in 2006.

Biography
McComas was born in Bethesda, Maryland, and his family moved to Harrison, Arkansas when he was four years old. At age sixteen, he attended a Paul Overstreet concert; while at the concert, Overstreet gave McComas the address of his publishing company. McComas submitted a demo tape to the publishing company, who then encouraged him to continue working on his writing skills.

McComas later attended college, but soon dropped out to move to Nashville, Tennessee. He briefly signed with Mercury Records, before he landed a deal with Lyric Street in 2001, charting the singles "Night Disappear With You" and "I Could Never Love You Enough." In 2003, he landed his first Top 10, "99.9% Sure (I've Never Been Here Before)" and the follow-up "You're in My Head", a No. 21 hit on the country charts. Another single for Lyric Street, "The Middle of Nowhere", fell short of the Top 40, and Lyric Street dropped him not long afterward. He later signed to Katapult Records, where he released Back Up Again, his second album.

Discography

Studio albums

Singles

A"You're in My Head" did not enter the Hot 100, but peaked at number 18 on Bubbling Under Hot 100 Singles.

Music videos

References

1972 births
American country singer-songwriters
Living people
Country musicians from Arkansas
Lyric Street Records artists
Mercury Records artists
People from Harrison, Arkansas
Singer-songwriters from Arkansas
21st-century American singers